The Most Valuable Player (MVP) was an annual award first awarded in the . Every player who has won the award has played for a team with at least 45 regular-season wins. The inaugural award winner was Hall of Famer Connie Hawkins. Hall of Famer Julius Erving won the award three times, all with the New York Nets. Mel Daniels won it twice with the Indiana Pacers.

All are in the Naismith Basketball Hall of Fame.

Erving and McGinnis both won the award for the 1974–75 season.

Daniels and Erving were the only multiple time winners.

Erving is the only player to also win the NBA Most Valuable Player Award.

References

American Basketball Association lists